Masani is a 2013 Indian Tamil-language supernatural horror thriller film directed by Padmaraj & LGR. The film stars Ramki, Akhil, Iniya, and Sija Rose, while Roja, Sarath Babu, Aadukalam Naren, and Y. G. Mahendra play supporting roles. The music is scored by N. Fazil. Masani is Ramki's comeback to Tamil cinema. This film received was highly panned by critics and a box office disaster. Ramki continued with subsequent disasters at the box office after this film.

Plot
Vishwa (Akhil) is raised by Swami (Y. G. Mahendra), a leading sculptor. Although Vishwa is a graduate, he has also learned the skill of sculpting from Swami. Vishwa meets Kavitha (Sija Rose), and both of them like each other. Meanwhile, there is a village where many sculptors come to finish a god's idol that is left incomplete a few years back, but all efforts go in vain as the sculptors are frightened and sent away by a ghost which prevents the completion of the idol. Sarath Babu is the village head, and Rajeshwari (Roja) is his wife. Rajeshwari has enmity with her relative Devanna Gounder (Aadukalam Naren), who happens to be Kavitha's father. As per the advice from an astrologer, Devanna meets Swami, requesting him to visit his village and complete the god's idol. However, Swami insists Vishwa to do the job on his behalf.

Swami tells a flashback to Vishwa. Vetri (Ramki) is the only brother of the village head who falls in love with Masani (Iniya), a lower caste girl from the same village. Masani gets pregnant, and Vetri decides to marry her against Rajeshwari's wishes. However, Vetri stands firm in his decision, while Rajeshwari poisons and kills Vetri. She also insults Masani for getting pregnant before wedding and isolates her out of the village, asking no one to help her. Masani undergoes many hardships as she is left alone. Swami comes to the village to make the god's idol and sees Masani in labor pain. Despite his attempts, no one comes forward to help her. Masani delivers a baby boy, informs about her life to Swami, and passes away. Swami gets furious on the village people and leaves the village without completing the idol, believing that the entire village will one day realize their mistake.

Swami adopts the baby, and he is none other than Vishwa. Vishwa comes to the village and successfully completes the idol. Masani's soul thrashes Rajeshwari which makes her confess all the truth to villagers. Rajeshwari then gets killed by Masani's soul. Swami arrives and informs that Vishwa is none other than the son of Vetri and Masani. The entire village realizes their mistake and apologizes to Vishwa. Finally, Vishwa is married to Kavitha.

Cast

 Ramki as Vettri
 Akhil as Vishva
 Iniya as Masaani
 Sija Rose as Kavitha
 Sarath Babu as Village Head
 Roja as Rajeshwari
 Aadukalam Naren as Devanna Gounder
 Y. G. Mahendra as Swami
 Chitti Babu as Minor
 Uma Padmanabhan as Mahalakshmi
 Sutha Prakash as Kamala
 Devan as Swami
 Manobala as Priest
 Pandi as Vishva's friend
 Rajesh Vaidya
 Bonda Mani
 Vasu Vikram
 Halwa Vasu
 Mohan Vaidya
 Rajendranath

Production

Soundtrack 

The soundtrack was composed by S. N. Fazil.

Release

Reception

References

External links 
 TBA at IMDb
2013 films
2010s ghost films
2010s Tamil-language films
2010s supernatural thriller films
Indian ghost films
Indian supernatural thriller films
Indian nonlinear narrative films